"Autonomus" is a frequent misspelling of "autonomous".

Saint Autonomus (died 313) is a martyr saint.  He is said to have been an Italian bishop who escaped the Diocletianic Persecution by migrating to Bithynia in Asia Minor.  He evangelized the region, served as first bishop of Bolu (Bithnynium), and was subsequently martyred. 

In the Eastern Orthodox Church, his feast day is celebrated on September 12.

External links
Autonomus

Further reading
Clive Foss, "St. Autonomus and His Church in Bithynia," Dumbarton Oaks Papers, Vol. 41, Studies on Art and Archeology in Honor of Ernst Kitzinger on His Seventy-Fifth Birthday (1987), pp. 187–198.

313 deaths
4th-century Christian martyrs
4th-century Romans
Year of birth unknown
Diocletianic Persecution